Alessandro Capello (born 12 December 1995) is an Italian footballer who plays as a forward for  club Carrarese.

Having begun his career at Bologna, he then moved to Cagliari and gained experience with a loan to Varese. Capello has represented Italy at youth international levels up to the under-19 team.

Club career

Bologna
Born in Bologna, Capello began his career at hometown club Bologna F.C. 1909. He made his debut on 28 November 2012 in the fourth round of the Coppa Italia, a 1–0 win over Livorno at the Stadio Renato Dall'Ara, replacing Luca Veratti for the final 14 minutes of the game. Aged 16, it was his only appearance for the club.

Inter
In June 2013, Inter Milan bought half the player's rights from Bologna (a co-ownership deal with Bologna), for €2.5 million (50% registration rights of Andrea Bandini and Andrea Romanò, plus €200,000 cash). In his only season with the Inter Primavera Youth side, he made 26 appearances in all competitions, scoring 8 goals between Primavera League, Coppa Italia and Torneo di Viareggio matches. Bologna and Inter bought back all their player's rights in June 2014 for the original price.

Cagliari
On 2 July 2014, Capello moved to Cagliari for €4 million from Bologna (€1 million cash plus defender Marios Oikonomou). Having been an unused substitute in 14 Serie A matches and one cup match, he made his debut for the Sardinian club on 14 January 2015 in the last 16 of the season's cup, a 2–1 loss at Parma. He was substituted after 56 minutes for Marco Sau, who scored Cagliari's goal.

Capello was loaned to Serie B club Varese for the remainder of the season on 2 February 2015. More often an unused substitute, he made four appearances for the team from Lombardy, of which only one was a start: a 1–0 defeat at Crotone on 10 May, in which he was replaced by Luca Miracoli with 15 minutes remaining.

On 31 August 2015, Capello left for Lega Pro club Prato in a temporary deal. Capello's number 16 shirt was also taken by youngster Davide Arras.

On 25 July 2016, Capello was signed by Olbia. The club also signed some youth products from Cagliari.

On 12 July 2017, Capello joined Padova on loan.

Venezia
On 21 July 2019, Capello signed to Venezia on a 2-year contract.

Virtus Entella 
On 19 January 2021, Capello signed with Serie B side, Virtus Entella.

Carrarese
On 1 September 2022, Capello moved to Carrarese on a two-year deal.

International career
Capello made his international debut for Italy under-17 in a 1–0 defeat away to Israel on 14 September 2011. He earned seven caps in total for that category, and went on to earn one for the under-18 team and two for the under-19 team in the following years.

Style of play
Described as a promising, modern, and dynamic forward, Capello is capable of playing anywhere along the front-line, and has been used both as a striker, and as a winger. A talented player, his main attributes are his technique, dribbling skills, and his striking ability from outside the area.

References

External links
 
 Italy national teams profile

1995 births
Footballers from Bologna
Living people
Italian footballers
Italy youth international footballers
Association football forwards
Bologna F.C. 1909 players
Cagliari Calcio players
S.S.D. Varese Calcio players
A.C. Prato players
Olbia Calcio 1905 players
Calcio Padova players
Venezia F.C. players
Virtus Entella players
Carrarese Calcio players
Serie B players
Serie C players